Clinton Stevenson "Praying Benny" Benedict (September 26, 1892 – November 12, 1976) was a Canadian professional lacrosse goalie, ice hockey goaltender who played for the Ottawa Senators and the Montreal Maroons. He played on four Stanley Cup-winning squads. He was the first goaltender in the National Hockey League (NHL) to wear a face mask. He led league goaltenders in shutouts seven times over his professional career. He is a member of the Hockey Hall of Fame.

Benedict played for the Ottawa Stars Lacrosse Club, winning the City Championship in 1911. He later played professionally with the Ottawa Capitals Lacrosse Club earning distinction for his tenacity under fire. This helped him immeasurably in his transition into professional hockey.

Benedict was one of the first great goalies in professional hockey and a great innovator in the sport. He was the first goalie to drop to his knees to stop the puck along the ice; at the time, dropping to the ice was illegal.  This earned him the nickname "Praying Benny." The first rule change the NHL made legalized his playing style.

Playing career
Benedict played senior-level hockey at 17, playing for the Ottawa Stewartons of the Ottawa City Hockey League in 1909–10, moving to the Ottawa New Edinburghs of the Interprovincial Amateur Hockey Union (IPAHU) the following season. Benedict joined the Ottawa Senators of the National Hockey Association (NHA) in the 1912–13 season. Although the Senators had at the time future Hockey Hall of Famer Percy LeSueur as their starting goaltender, Benedict played 10 games for the club. During the 1912–13 season he was also manager Art Ross' goaltender of choice for the NHA All-Stars, a team which played in five exhibition games against the PCHA All-Stars, losing three games to two.

Benedict played one more season as backup to LeSueur, in 1913–14, and took over as starting goaltender in the 1914–15 season. He led the league in goals against average (GAA) that season and the following two seasons to start his career. He played 12 seasons overall for the Senators, five in the NHA and seven in the NHL.

After winning three Stanley Cups with the Senators, his career changed in the 1923–24 season. Benedict developed a problem with drinking, which at first was kept secret by the Senators. Benedict occasionally played for the Senators while under the effects. In the playoffs, Benedict and the Senators played poorly and were quickly eliminated. Management withheld some of his salary for his behaviour. Benedict sued the team in return and the Senators countersued, revealing in court documents the extent of Benedict's behaviour. Once the Ottawa papers found out about the court case, the secret was out. The two sides quickly settled to minimize the publicity.

Benedict's career with the Senators was finished. On October 20, 1924, Benedict was traded along with Punch Broadbent to the expansion Montreal Maroons. It was a new lease on life for Benedict who played for six seasons with the Maroons. In 1926, he won another Stanley Cup with the Maroons after having recorded three shutouts in the Stanley Cup Finals against the Victoria Cougars.

In 1930, some 30 years before Jacques Plante popularized the goalie mask, Clint was the first goalie to wear facial protection in the NHL with the Montreal Maroons using it for five games during the 1929–30 season. On January 7, 1930, he was hit by a shot from Howie Morenz in the face, breaking the bridge of his nose. Benedict was out of action for six weeks. He returned on February 20, 1930 against the New York Americans wearing the mask. He played with a mask for five games in total and according to author Douglas Hunter, Benedict modified or tried different masks during the sequence of games. His last game wearing a mask was on March 4, 1930 when he got hit in the face during a goal-mouth scramble. He had to leave the game due to blood coming from his nose. When asked about his short-lived face mask Benedict remarked:  
The game against Ottawa was his last game in the NHL. In June 1930, Benedict was placed on waivers. The next season, he played for the Windsor Bulldogs senior hockey team, the Maroons farm team, leading them to the IHL championship. In 1932, Benedict became manager and coach of Saint John Beavers of the Maritime Senior Hockey League, a position he held for two seasons. Benedict was inducted into the Hockey Hall of Fame in 1965, much later than would be expected of a player of his ability and career and possibly due to the events of 1924. Benedict lived to 84 years of age, dying in 1976 in Ottawa.

Career statistics

Regular season and playoffs

* Stanley Cup Champion.

Awards and achievements
 1965 – Inducted into the Hockey Hall of Fame
 1966 – Named All-Star goaltender for the time period 1893–1926 by NHL historian Charles Coleman
 1966 – Inducted into Ottawa Sports Hall of Fame
 1998 – Ranked number 77 on The Hockey News' list of the 100 Greatest Hockey Players.

References

Bibliography

Notes

External links
 
 Clint Benedict at Just Sports Stats

1892 births
1976 deaths
Canadian ice hockey goaltenders
Hockey Hall of Fame inductees
Ice hockey people from Ottawa
Montreal Maroons players
Ottawa Senators (1917) players
Ottawa Senators (NHA) players
Ottawa Senators (original) players
Stanley Cup champions
Windsor Bulldogs (1929–1936) players
Burials at Beechwood Cemetery (Ottawa)